Julia Mikhaylovna Pleshkova (born 17 May 1997) is a Russian World Cup alpine ski racer from Yelizovo, Russia. She made her World Cup debut on 23 February 2019 in Crans-Montana, Switzerland.

World Cup results

Season standings

World Championship results

References

External links
 
 Julia Pleshkova Result at the International Ski Federation
 

Russian female alpine skiers
1997 births
Living people
People from Yelizovo
Universiade medalists in alpine skiing
Universiade bronze medalists for Russia
Competitors at the 2019 Winter Universiade
Alpine skiers at the 2022 Winter Olympics
Olympic alpine skiers of Russia
21st-century Russian women